Denbighshire was a county constituency in Denbighshire, in north Wales, from 1542 to 1885.

History 
From 1542, it returned one Member of Parliament (MP), traditionally known as the knight of the shire, to the House of Commons of the Parliament of England until 1707, then to the Parliament of Great Britain until 1800, and to the Parliament of the United Kingdom from 1801.  These MPs were elected by the first past the post voting system.

Under the Reform Act 1832, the constituency's representation was increased to two members, elected by the bloc vote system.

The constituency was abolished by the Redistribution of Seats Act 1885 for the 1885 general election, when Denbighshire was split into two single-member constituencies: the Eastern and Western divisions, each returning one Member of Parliament.

Members of Parliament

MPs 1542–1604

MPs 1604–1832

MPs 1832–1885

Election results

Elections in the 1830s

Elections in the 1840s
Williams-Wynn's death caused a by-election.

Williams-Wynn was appointed Steward of the Queen's Lordships and Manors of Bromfield and Yale, requiring a by-election.

Elections in the 1850s

Elections in the 1860s

Elections in the 1870s

Elections in the 1880s

Morgan was appointed Judge Advocate General of the Armed Forces, requiring a by-election.

Wynn's death caused a by-election.

References 

 

Historic parliamentary constituencies in North Wales
Constituencies of the Parliament of the United Kingdom established in 1542
Constituencies of the Parliament of the United Kingdom disestablished in 1885
History of Denbighshire